Martin H. Herzog (September 13, 1878 – May 24, 1971) was a member of the Wisconsin State Assembly from 1939 to 1940. He was a member of the Wisconsin Progressive Party.

Born in Mount Pleasant, Wisconsin, Herzog went to Patterson Commercial College in Racine, Wisconsin and was a farmer. He served on the Mount Pleasant town board and was the chairman. He also served as town treasurer. He then moved to Sturtevant, Wisconsin and served on the village board and was president. Herzog served on the Racine County, Wisconsin Board of Supervisors and was Racine County sheriff. Herzog died on May 24, 1971.

References

External links

People from Mount Pleasant, Wisconsin
Farmers from Wisconsin
Wisconsin sheriffs
Mayors of places in Wisconsin
Wisconsin city council members
County supervisors in Wisconsin
Members of the Wisconsin State Assembly
Wisconsin Progressives (1924)
20th-century American politicians
1878 births
1971 deaths